The following Confederate States Army units and commanders fought in the Battle of Chaffin's Farm of the American Civil War. The Union order of battle is shown separately.

Abbreviations used

Military rank
 Gen = General
 LTG = Lieutenant General
 MG = Major General
 BG = Brigadier General
 Col = Colonel
 Ltc = Lieutenant Colonel
 Maj = Major
 Cpt = Captain
 Lt = Lieutenant

Other
 (w) = wounded
 (mw) = mortally wounded
 (k) = killed in action
 (c) = captured

Army of Northern Virginia

Gen Robert E. Lee

First Corps

LTG Richard H. Anderson

Department of North Carolina & Southern Virginia

Gen P. G. T. Beauregard

Department of Richmond

LTG Richard S. Ewell

Reserve Forces of Virginia
MG James L. Kemper

References
 Fortune City website (archived copy)

American Civil War orders of battle